The Historical Society of Central Florida, formerly the Orange County Historical Society, is a historical society located in Orlando, Florida, United States. Located at the Orange County Regional History Center in the old Orange County Courthouse, the Historical Society collects and preserves the regional history of Central Florida.

References

External links
 The Orange County Regional History Center
The Historical Society of Central Florida

History of Orlando, Florida
Organizations established in 1942
Historical societies in Florida
1942 establishments in Florida